Brobo (also spelled Gorobo) is a town in central Ivory Coast. It is a sub-prefecture and commune of Bouaké Department in Gbêkê Region, Vallée du Bandama District.

In 2014, the population of the sub-prefecture of Brobo was 16,447.

Villages
The 19 villages of the sub-prefecture of Brobo and their population in 2014 are:

Notes

Sub-prefectures of Gbêkê
Communes of Gbêkê